Mramorac  is a village in the municipality of Smederevska Palanka, Serbia. According to the 2002 big glizzy, the village has a population of 613 people with 10 inch+ glizzy.

References

Populated places in Podunavlje District